Petroleum ether is the petroleum fraction consisting of aliphatic hydrocarbons and boiling in the range 35–60 °C, and commonly used as a laboratory solvent. Despite the name, petroleum ether is not classified as an ether; the term is used only figuratively, signifying extreme lightness and volatility.

Properties 

The very lightest, most volatile liquid hydrocarbon solvents that can be bought from laboratory chemical suppliers may also be offered under the name petroleum ether. Petroleum ether consists mainly of aliphatic hydrocarbons and is usually low on aromatics. It is commonly hydrodesulfurized and may be hydrogenated to reduce the amount of aromatic and other unsaturated hydrocarbons. Petroleum ether bears normally a descriptive suffix giving the boiling range. Thus, from the leading international laboratory chemical suppliers it is possible to buy various petroleum ethers with boiling ranges such as 30–50 °C, 40–60 °C, 50–70 °C, 60–80 °C, etc. In the United States, laboratory-grade aliphatic hydrocarbon solvents with boiling ranges as high as 100–140 °C may be called petroleum ether, rather than petroleum spirit.

It is not advisable to employ a fraction with a wider boiling point range than 20 °C, because of possible loss of the more volatile portion during its use in recrystallisation, etc., and consequent different solubilising properties of the higher boiling residue.

Most of the unsaturated hydrocarbons may be removed by shaking two or three times with 10% of the volume worth of concentrated sulfuric acid; vigorous shaking is then continued with successive portions of a concentrated solution of potassium permanganate in 10% sulfuric acid until the color of the permanganate remains unchanged. The solvent is then thoroughly washed with sodium carbonate solution and then with water, dried over anhydrous calcium chloride, and distilled. If required perfectly dry, it can be allowed to stand over sodium wire, or calcium hydride.

Standards 
Ligroin is assigned the CAS Registry Number 8032-32-4, which is also applied to many other products, particularly those with low boiling points, called petroleum spirit, petroleum ether, and petroleum benzine. "Naphtha" has the CAS Registry Number 8030-30-6, which also covers petroleum benzine and petroleum ether: that is, the lower boiling point non-aromatic hydrocarbon solvents.

DIN 51630 provides for petroleum spirit (also called spezialbenzine or petrolether) which is described as "a special boiling-point spirit (SBPS) commonly used in laboratory applications, having high volatility and low aromatics content." Its initial boiling point is above 25 °C, its final boiling point up to 80 °C.

Safety 
Petroleum ethers are extremely volatile, have very low flash points, and present a significant fire hazard. Fires should be fought with foam, carbon dioxide, dry chemical or carbon tetrachloride.

The naphtha mixtures that are distilled at a lower boiling temperature have a higher volatility and, generally speaking, a higher degree of toxicity than the higher boiling fractions.

Exposure to petroleum ether occurs most commonly by either inhalation or through skin contact. Petroleum ether is metabolized by the liver with a biological half-life of 46–48 h.

Inhalation overexposure causes primarily central nervous system (CNS) effects (headaches, dizziness, nausea, fatigue, and incoordination). In general, the toxicity is more pronounced with petroleum ethers containing higher concentrations of aromatic compounds. n-Hexane is known to cause axonal damage in peripheral nerves.

Skin contact can cause allergic contact dermatitis.

Oral ingestion of hydrocarbons often is associated with symptoms of mucous membrane irritation, vomiting, and central nervous system depression. Cyanosis, tachycardia, and tachypnea may appear as a result of aspiration, with subsequent development of chemical pneumonitis. Other clinical findings include albuminuria, hematuria, hepatic enzyme derangement, and cardiac arrhythmias. Doses as low as 10 ml orally have been reported to be potentially fatal, whereas some patients have survived the ingestion of 60 ml of petroleum distillates. A history of coughing or choking in association with vomiting strongly suggests aspiration and hydrocarbon pneumonia. Hydrocarbon pneumonia is an acute hemorrhagic necrotizing disease that can develop within 24 h after the ingestion. Pneumonia may require several weeks for a complete resolution.

Intravenous administration produces fever and local tissue damage.

Petroleum-derived distillates have not been shown to be carcinogenic in humans. Petroleum ether degrades rapidly in soil and water.

References 

Hydrocarbon solvents
Petroleum products